The Quasar-Unipower was a box-like car produced in limited numbers between 1967 and 1968 by Universal Power Drives of Perivale, Middlesex, England who also built the Unipower GT sports car.

Designed by Quasar Khanh, a French-Vietnamese designer and engineer, the car used plastic inflatable seats, a glass roof and sliding glass doors, in a cube-like configuration that was wider than it was long. The Unipower employed a four-cylinder 1100 cc BMC engine with an automatic transmission. Modified Mini subframes carried the suspension components and Mini 10 inch wheels were used.

See also
 List of car manufacturers of the United Kingdom

References

External links
 web site about the Quasar Unipower (in French) 
 official web site for Quasar Khanh world's

Defunct motor vehicle manufacturers of the United Kingdom